is a railway station of Chūō Main Line, East Japan Railway Company (JR East) in Ryūō-shinmachi, in the city of Kai, Yamanashi Prefecture, Japan. The station is also a container terminal for the Japan Freight Railway Company (JR Freight).

Lines
Ryūō Station is served by the Chūō Main Line, and is 138.6 kilometers from the terminus of the line at Tokyo Station.

Layout
Ryūō Station has an elevated station building with one side platform and one island platform, serving three tracks. The station has a Midori no Madoguchi staffed ticket office.

Platforms

History
Ryūō Station opened on December 15, 1903 as a station on the Japanese Government Railways (JGR). The JGR became the JNR (Japanese National Railways) after the end of World War II.  With the dissolution and privatization of the JNR on April 1, 1987, the station came under the joint control of the East Japan Railway Company and the Japan Freight Railway Company. A container terminal was established on June 1, 1988. Automated turnstiles using the Suica IC Card system came into operation from October 16, 2004. A new station building was completed in March 2008.

Passenger statistics
In fiscal 2017, the station was used by an average of 2,355 passengers daily (boarding passengers only).

Gallery

Bus terminals

Highway Buses 
Highway buses depart from the south exit.
 Chūō Kōsoku Bus; For Shinjuku Station (Yamanashi Kōtsū, Keio Bus East)
 Airport Limousine; For Haneda Airport (YamanashiKotsu, Keihin Kyuko Line)
 For Yokohama Station (Yamanashi Kotsu, Keihin Kyuko Bus)
 Airport Limousine; For Narita International Airport (Yamanashi Kotsu, Chiba Kotsu)
 For Minobu, Shin-Shizuoka Station, and Shizuoka Station (Yamanashi Kotsu, Shizutetsu Justline)
 Nagoya Liner Kofu; For Iida, Nakatsugawa, and Nagoya Station (Yamanashi Kotsu, JR Tokai Bus)
 Crystal Liner; For Kyōto Station, Ōsaka Station, Ōsaka Namba Station, and Universal Studios Japan (Yamanashi Kotsu, Kintetsu Bus)

Surrounding area
 Ryūō post office
 Kōfu City Hall

See also
 List of railway stations in Japan

References

 Miyoshi Kozo. Chuo-sen Machi to eki Hyaku-niju nen. JT Publishing (2009)

External links

JR East Ryūō Station

Railway stations in Yamanashi Prefecture
Railway stations in Japan opened in 1903
Stations of East Japan Railway Company
Stations of Japan Freight Railway Company
Chūō Main Line
Kai, Yamanashi